The Chaos de Montpellier-le-Vieux is a  blockfield at the southern edge of the Causse Noir, above the Gorges de la Dourbie, north-east of Millau and its famous viaduct, in the commune of La Roque-Sainte-Marguerite, Aveyron, France.

The rocks consist of dolomite.

External links 

 Chaos de Montpellier-le-Vieux, Official site
 Chaos de Montpellier-le-Vieux, at aveyron.com

Landforms of Aveyron
Rock formations of France
Natural arches of France
Tourist attractions in Aveyron